ECRI may refer to:
 European Commission against Racism and Intolerance, the Council of Europe's independent human rights monitoring body
 European Credit Research Institute, an independent, nonprofit research institute that provides analysis and insight into the structure, evolution and regulation of retail financial services markets in Europe
 Economic Cycle Research Institute, an independent institute dedicated to economic cycle research, based in New York and London 
 ECRI, formerly the Emergency Care Research Institute
 Environmental Criminology Research Inc., a crime analysis software developer